Thomas Wykes (fl. 1554), of Moreton Jeffries, Herefordshire, was an English politician.

He was a Member (MP) of the Parliament of England for Leominster in November 1554.

References

Year of birth missing
Year of death missing
People from Herefordshire
English MPs 1554–1555